The Cleveland Street United States Post Office, or simply Cleveland Street Post Office, is a historic site in Clearwater, Florida. It is located at 650 Cleveland Street. It was dedicated on October 9, 1933. It was built by the Walt and Sinclair construction firm in a Mediterranean-Revival architecture style. On August 7, 1980, it was added to the U.S. National Register of Historic Places.

Gallery

See also 
List of United States post offices

References

External links 
 Pinellas County listings at National Register of Historic Places
 Florida's Office of Cultural and Historical Programs
 Pinellas County listings
 Cleveland Street Post Office

Buildings and structures in Clearwater, Florida
National Register of Historic Places in Pinellas County, Florida
1933 establishments in Florida